Postal codes in Turkey consist of five digits starting with the two digit license plate code of the provinces followed by three digits to specify the location within the districts of the province.

See also
 ISO 3166-2:TR

External links 
 Postal codes lookup tool (Turkish)

Turkey
Postal codes
Postal system of Turkey